Pietro Mori (born 13 November 1908, date of death unknown) was an Italian racing cyclist. He rode in the 1931 Tour de France.

References

1908 births
Year of death missing
Italian male cyclists
Place of birth missing